Dolorian  is a doom metal band from Oulu, Finland. Their early recordings are viewed as prime examples of blackened doom metal. Later recordings mixed dark ambient music with the traditional doom metal style.

The band was founded in mid-1997 as a duo consisting of A. Haapapuro and A. Kukkohovi. Their combination of varied songs, structures and melodies, several vocal styles, and obscure spiritual lyrics set the band apart from many others in their genre.

Dolorian recorded their first demos in autumn 1997 at Tico-Tico Studios with temporary keyboard player H. Riihinen. They were subsequently signed with Wounded Love Records. In April 1998 the band, along with their new keyboard player J. Ontero, recorded the debut album When All the Laughter Has Gone. The album was released in 1999. The following year, the band recorded their second album. Entitled simply Dolorian, it was a continuation of the black doom sound of their debut, although with much quieter vocals. The self-titled album, considering the raw black/doom sound of the first album, Dolorian, blurs the boundaries of clear classification by instilling a more psychedelic and ambient backdrop. 

In 2002, Dolorian recorded songs for a split release with Shining, but record label problems delayed its release until 2004. In 2006, the band released their third album, Voidwards, which demonstrated a further shift in their sound and included the usage of dark ambient elements. Their latest album is a blend of sounds from their previous releases. On the one hand there are long passages of ambient, psychedelic rock, with heavy flange, and clean vocals: on the other hand, there are loud blackened doom metal passages to contrast the atmospheric stylations, with a blend of two harsh vocals (one high and raspy, the other deep and growly), heavy distortion, and blaring synthesizers.

The band has been on hold since 2006. All of its members are involved in dark ambient projects, which has likely shifted their concentration away from Dolorian.

Members
Anti Ittna Haapapuro – vocals, electric guitar (1997–present)
Ari Kukkohovi – bass guitar, drums, electric guitar (1997–present)
Jussi Ontero – keyboard (1998–present)

Discography
1999 – When All the Laughter Has Gone
2001 – Dolorian
2006 – Voidwards

References

External links
 Dolorian official website
 Dolorian on Encyclopaedia Metallum
 Dolorian on Last.fm (includes music samples)
 Helixes musical collective

Avant-garde metal musical groups
Finnish doom metal musical groups
Finnish musical trios
Musical groups established in 1997